Jack Stubbs (April 6, 1913 – February 2, 1997) was an American set decorator, who was born in Scotland. He was nominated for an Academy Award in the category Best Art Direction for the film Love Is a Many-Splendored Thing.

Selected filmography
 Love Is a Many-Splendored Thing (1955)

References

External links

1913 births
1997 deaths
American set decorators
British emigrants to the United States